Starye Omutishchi is a rural locality (a village) in Petushinskoye Rural Settlement, Petushinsky District, Vladimir Oblast, Russia. The population was 274 in 2010. There are 17 streets.

Geography 
Starye Omutishchi is located 12 km west of Petushki (the district's administrative centre) by road. Novye Omutishchi is the nearest rural locality.

References 

Rural localities in Petushinsky District